Åsskard is a village in Surnadal Municipality in Møre og Romsdal county, Norway.  The village is located in the western part of the municipality, at the innermost part of the Åsskardfjorden which is a branch off the main Trongfjorden.  The village is the site of Åsskard Church.

The only road connecting Halsa and Surnadal, County Road 65, runs through the village.  

Historically, the village was the administrative centre of the old Åsskard Municipality from 1895 until the dissolution of the municipality in 1965.

References

Villages in Møre og Romsdal
Surnadal